The MGM Album is a 1989 album by American vocalist Michael Feinstein of songs from Metro-Goldwyn-Mayer films. The album is arranged by Ian Bernard and Larry Wilcox.

Reception

The Allmusic review by William Ruhlmann awarded the album three stars and said of Feinstein, "As usual, Feinstein sings in his earnest tenor, which has gained range and expression as an instrument over his recording career, and he savors the words with a scholar's affection. He serves the material, sometimes reverently, although it is still true that the least impressive thing about a Michael Feinstein album tends to be Michael Feinstein himself".

Track listing
 "MGM Fanfare" (Franz Waxman) - 0:16
 "That's Entertainment!" (Howard Dietz, Arthur Schwartz) - 2:04
 "It's a Most Unusual Day" (Harold Adamson, Jimmy McHugh) - 3:52
 "Time After Time" (Sammy Cahn, Jule Styne) - 4:37
 "Spring, Spring, Spring" (Gene de Paul, Johnny Mercer) - 3:34
 "Friendly Star"/"This Heart of Mine" (Mack Gordon, Harry Warren)/(Warren, Freed) - 6:00
 "Our Love Affair" (Roger Edens, Arthur Freed) - 4:06
 "Please Don't Say No, Say Maybe" (Sammy Fain, Freed) - 3:26
 "Wonder Why" (Nicholas Brodszky, Cahn) - 3:44
 "All I Do Is Dream of You"/"You Are My Lucky Star" (Nacio Herb Brown, Freed)/(Freed, Brown) - 5:26
 "If I Only Had a Brain" (Harold Arlen, Yip Harburg) - 6:33
 "You and I" (Leslie Bricusse) - 3:31
 "Singin' in the Rain" (Brown, Freed) - 3:08
 "That's Entertainment! (Reprise)" - 1:46

Personnel
Performance
Michael Feinstein - vocals, liner notes
Jerry Herman - piano
Larry Wilcox - arranger
Ian Bernard - arranger, conductor, producer
Chuck Berghofer - double bass, bass guitar
Larry Corbett - cello
Dennis Karmazyn
Ray Kelley
Ron Leonard
Gerald Vinci - concertmaster, violin
John Guerin - drums
David Duke - French horn
Bill Lane
Joe Meyer	
Brian O'Connor
Tim May - guitar
Gayle Levant - harp
Larry Bunker - percussion
Gary Coleman
Alan Broadbent - piano
Pete Jolly
Herbie Harper - trombone
Donald Waldrop
Chauncey Welsch
Bob Findley - trumpet
Chuck Findley
Donald Smith
Marilyn Baker - viola
Samuel Boghossian
Ken Burwood-Hoy
Alan de Yeritch
Pamela Goldsmith
Peter Hatch
Margot MacLaine
Arnold Belnick - violin
Harry Cykman
Isabelle Daskoff
Assa Drori
Bruce Dukov
Henry Ferber
Peter Kent
Brian Leonard
Gordon Marron
Don Palmer
Debra Price
Haim Shtrum
Marshall Sosson
Robert Sushel
Mari Tsumura-Botnick
Shari Zippert
Bob Cooper - woodwind
Robert Cooper
Ronnie Lang
John Lowe
Bob Shepherd
Phil Sobel	
Sheridon Stokes

Production
Jon Gardey - photography
Roddy McDowall
Teddy Antolin - hair stylist, makeup
Carol Bobolts - art direction
Dennis Ziemienski - artwork, illustrations
Rick Winquest - assistant engineer
Jules Chaikin - contractor
Hank Cicalo - engineer
Gary Klein - executive producer
Charles Koppelman
Suzie Katayama - music preparation

References

Elektra Records albums
Michael Feinstein albums
1989 albums